The men's eight competition was one of six events for male competitors in Rowing at the 2004 Summer Olympics in Athens. It was held from 15 to 22 August. There were 9 boats (81 competitors) from 9 nations, with each nation limited to a single boat in the event. The event was won by the United States, the nation's first victory in the men's eight since 1964 and 12th overall. The Netherlands took silver. Australia, the reigning silver medalist, finished with bronze this time.

Background

This was the 24th appearance of the event. Rowing had been on the programme in 1896 but was cancelled due to bad weather. The men's eight has been held every time that rowing has been contested, beginning in 1900.

The field was competitive. Canada was favoured, with wins at the 2002 and 2003 World Championships as well as Grand Challenge Cup victories in those years. But there were numerous strong contenders, including the United States (2003 Pan American champions, 2003 World runners-up), Romania (2001 World champions), Great Britain (defending Olympic champions), and the Netherlands (2004 Grand Challenge Cup winners).

No nations made their debut in the event. The United States made its 21st appearance, most among nations to that point.

Competition format

The "eight" event featured nine-person boats, with eight rowers and a coxswain. It was a sweep rowing event, with the rowers each having one oar (and thus each rowing on one side). The course used the 2000 metres distance that became the Olympic standard in 1912 (with the exception of 1948). Races were held in up to six lanes.

The competition consisted of two main rounds (semifinals and finals) as well as a repechage. 

 Semifinals: Two heats of four or five boats each. The top boat in each heat (2 boats total) advanced directly to the "A" final, while all other boats (7 total) went to the repechage.
 Repechage: Two heats of three or four boats each. The top two boats in each heat (4 boats total) rejoined the semifinal winners in the "A" final, with the 3rd and 4th place boats in each heat (3 boats total) eliminated from medal contention and competing in the "B" final.
 Finals: The "A" final consisted of the top six boats, awarding medals and 4th through 6th place. The "B" final featured the next three boats, ranking them 7th through 9th.

Schedule

All times are Greece Standard Time (UTC+2)

Results

Semifinals

Semifinal 1

Semifinal 2

The second heat of the men's eight was a particularly intense match as the United States pulled ahead of Canada (undefeated since 2001) in the last 500 metres. The Canadian eight was a favourite for the gold, whereas the American eight had never before been tried internationally. Both boats beat the world's best time for the men's eight, and the United States advances directly to the finals while Canada went to the repechage.

Repechage

Repechage heat 1

Repechage heat 2

Finals

Final B

Final A

The United States established an early lead. By the 1000 meter mark (halfway), they had a three-second advantage (one length) over Australia, Canada, Germany, and the Netherlands who were all battling for second place. In the final 1000 meters, the Netherlands made a run at the United States, finishing 1.3 seconds short. Australia maintained its position three seconds behind the United States while Germany and Canada fell off the pace and France trailed in sixth place. The fifth-place finish was a major disappointment for Canada, the two-time defending World Champions.

References

External links
Official Olympic Report

Men's Eight
Men's events at the 2004 Summer Olympics